Parafluda is a monotypic genus of jumping spiders containing the single species, Parafluda banksi. It was first described by Arthur Merton Chickering in 1946, and is only found in Argentina and Panama. The name is a combination of the Ancient Greek "para", meaning "alongside", and the salticid genus Fluda. The species is named in honor of Nathan Banks.

See also
Fluda
Pseudofluda

References

Monotypic Salticidae genera
Salticidae
Spiders of South America